Volcano Mountain is a cinder cone in central Yukon Territory, Canada, located a short distance north of Fort Selkirk, near the confluence of the Pelly and Yukon Rivers. Volcano Mountain is called Nelrúna in the Northern Tutchone language.

Geology

Volcano Mountain is the youngest volcano in the Fort Selkirk Volcanic Field and one of the youngest in the northern section of the Northern Cordilleran Volcanic Province. The lava at Volcano Mountain is olivine nephelinite, which is an uncommon type of lava. This type of lava is believed to have come from much deeper inside the Earth than basaltic lava.

Volcanic hazards

Future eruptions from Volcano Mountain would probably be lava flows, since there is a lack of pyroclastic material. The main hazards from Volcano Mountain are forest fires started by the lava flows and poisonous gases. Older volcanic deposits south of Volcano Mountain indicate that lava flows may have once partly blocked or at least altered the course of the Yukon and Pelly Rivers. Any future activity in this area could disrupt the course of both of these major rivers and could have a serious impact on people living or working downstream.

See also
 List of Northern Cordilleran volcanoes
 List of volcanoes in Canada
 Volcanism in Canada

External links
 Natural Resources Canada
 Volcano World
 Catalogue of Canadian volcanoes: Volcano Mountain

One-thousanders of Yukon
Cinder cones of Canada
Volcanoes of Yukon
Northern Cordilleran Volcanic Province
Polygenetic cinder cones